Pholidoscelis is a genus of lizards that belongs to the family Teiidae. All species are endemic to the West Indies.

Classification
Listed alphabetically.
Pholidoscelis alboguttatus (Boulenger, 1896) – Mona ground lizard, Mona ameiva
Pholidoscelis atratus (Garman, 1887) – Redonda ameiva
Pholidoscelis auberi (Cocteau, 1838) – Auber's ameiva, Cuban ameiva
Pholidoscelis chrysolaemus (Cope, 1868) – common ameiva, Hispaniolan giant ameiva
†Pholidoscelis cineraceus (Barbour & Noble, 1915) – Guadeloupe ameiva (extinct)
Pholidoscelis corax (Censky & Paulson, 1992) – Censky's ameiva, Anguilla black ameiva, Little Scrub Island ground lizard
Pholidoscelis corvinus (Cope, 1861) – Sombrero ameiva
Pholidoscelis desechensis (Heatwole & Torres, 1967) – Desecheo ground lizard
Pholidoscelis dorsalis (Gray, 1838) – Jamaica ameiva
Pholidoscelis erythrocephalus (Daudin, 1802) – St. Christopher ameiva
Pholidoscelis exsul (Cope, 1862) – common Puerto Rican ameiva
Pholidoscelis fuscatus (Garman, 1887) – Dominican ameiva
Pholidoscelis griswoldi (Barbour, 1916) – Antiguan ameiva, Griswold's ameiva
Pholidoscelis lineolatus (Duméril & Bibron, 1839) – Pigmy blue-tailed ameiva, dwarf teiid
†Pholidoscelis major (Duméril & Bibron, 1839) – Martinique ameiva, Martinique giant ameiva
Pholidoscelis maynardi (Garman, 1888) – Great Inagua ameiva 
Pholidoscelis plei (Duméril & Bibron, 1839) – Anguilla Bank Ameiva
Pholidoscelis pluvianotatus (Garman, 1887) – Montserrat ameiva
Pholidoscelis polops (Cope, 1862) – St. Croix ameiva, St. Croix ground lizard
Pholidoscelis taeniurus (Cope, 1862) – Hispaniolan blue-tailed ameiva, Haitian ameiva
Pholidoscelis wetmorei (Stejneger, 1913) – Puerto Rican blue-tailed ameiva, Wetmore's ameiva

References

 
Lizard genera
Taxa named by Leopold Fitzinger
Lizards of the Caribbean